Donald Newton Langenberg (March 17, 1932 – January 25, 2019) was an American physicist, academic, and university administrator. He served as chancellor of the University System of Maryland from 1990 until 2002 and was the first chancellor of the University of Illinois at Chicago. Langenberg taught at the University of Oxford, the École Normale Supérieure, the California Institute of Technology, and the Technische Universität München and served on the Board of Trustees at the University of the District of Columbia and the University of Pennsylvania.

Langenberg earned his bachelor's degree from Iowa State University, master's degree from the University of California, Los Angeles and Ph.D. from the University of California, Berkeley. He also received honorary degrees from the University of Pennsylvania and the State University of New York. In 1980, he was named Deputy Director of the National Science Foundation by Jimmy Carter. Among the awards he received are the John Price Wetherill Medal of the Franklin Institute and the Distinguished Contribution to Research Administration Award of the Society of Research Administrators. As a physicist, Langenberg was an expert in the area of superconductivity.

Langenberg died in January 2019, at the age of 86, at his home in the Dickeyville Historic District of Baltimore.

References

1932 births
2019 deaths
21st-century American physicists
Chancellors of the University System of Maryland
Fellows of the American Physical Society
Iowa State University alumni
Leaders of the University of Illinois
People from Devils Lake, North Dakota
University of California, Los Angeles alumni
University of California, Berkeley alumni
University of Pennsylvania people
University of the District of Columbia trustees
Presidents of the American Physical Society